The Knitters are a Los Angeles-based band who play country, rockabilly and folk music. The Knitters' name is a play on the name of the folk group The Weavers.

Background

The Knitters formed in 1982 as a side project to the band members' primary commitments. Vocalist Exene Cervenka,  singer/bassist John Doe and drummer DJ Bonebrake were three of the four members of the punk band X; guitarist Dave Alvin was a member of roots rock band The Blasters as well as The Flesh Eaters; and stand-up bassist Jonny Ray Bartel was a member of blues-rock band The Red Devils.

The Knitters' debut album Poor Little Critter on the Road was released in 1985. It included mainly traditional and cover songs, together with some X songs performed in an acoustic style. The album drew on blues, folk, country and rockabilly influences.  In 1999, the label Bloodshot Records released a track-by-track tribute to the album entitled Poor Little Knitter on the Road.

After the debut album's release, all the group members continued to work with their primary bands. Dave Alvin also later pursued a solo career.

Twenty years later, in 2005, the group released their second and ironically-titled album, The Modern Sounds of the Knitters. John Doe has been quoted as saying "The Knitters, like their music, don't do anything hasty. Since our last record's been out for a while and it did pretty good, we figured it was just about time to put out another." The Modern Sounds of the Knitters has been well received by critics.

Discography 
 Poor Little Critter on the Road (1985) – US No. 204
 The Modern Sounds of the Knitters (2005)

Reviews

References

External links
  AllMusic
 
 

American alternative country groups
Cowpunk musical groups
Folk punk groups
Musical groups established in 1982
Musical groups from Los Angeles
Zoë Records artists
1982 establishments in California
X (American band)